Article 96 of the Japanese Constitution is a clause in the national Constitution of Japan specifying the process for making amendments. The Constitution has remained unchanged since coming into effect on May 3, 1947, and many politicians are calling for a revision of Article 96 so that they can begin revising other, more central Articles (like Article 9).

Text of the article 
The full text of the article in Japanese, and its official English translation, reads:

Debate
The Japanese Constitution has not been revised since it was first created in 1947. By contrast, the United States has made six constitutional amendments since WWII,  and France has made twenty-four.  Since then, many Japanese have advocated for revisions to numerous articles but they have been unable to gain the support of two-thirds (a supermajority) of both houses of the National Diet (both the House of Councillors and the House of Representatives), let alone the simple majority of the Japanese electorate in the subsequent referendum vote (as required by Article 96). As such, proponents of revision have set their sights on Article 96, hoping to revise it so that amendments no longer require a supermajority in the Diet. The primary motive behind the revision of Article 96 appears to be the revision of Article 9, which "renounce war as a sovereign right of the nation" and promises that "land, sea, and air forces, as well as other war potential, will never be maintained". However, other Articles (like Article 97 regarding fundamental human rights) have also been proposed for revision or deletion. Some scholars think Article 96 cannot be amended because this article defines the power to exercise constituent power which is a constituted power created by the constituent power, and constituent power itself cannot be changed by the Constitution.

Shinzo Abe, the former Prime Minister of Japan, was a vocal proponent of revising Article 96, stating that "It's unfair that just more than one-third of lawmakers could block revisions even if 50 percent or more of the public want to amend the Constitution". Given that his Liberal Democratic Party controls both Houses of the National Diet (for the first time in nearly a decade), political pundits say that he has a fair chance to succeed. However, the Liberal Democratic Party's coalition partner, New Komeito, may be unwilling to support such a change, and in fact, the Liberal Democratic Party appeared to drop the issue from its platform in the run up to the House of Councillors election in 2013. Moreover, the Japanese population appears to be roughly divided regarding the revision of Article 96, with 42% in favor and 46% against according to a recent Mainichi Shimbun poll. A separate NHK survey showed that nearly 50% of Japanese had no opinion on the subject.

The LDP's proposed constitutional amendment would amend Article 96 as follows:

References

Constitutions of Japan